Albanisation, Albanianisation (UK), Albanization, or Albanianization (US) is the spread of Albanian culture, people, and language, either by integration or assimilation. Diverse peoples were affected by Albanisation including peoples with different ethnic origins, such as Turks, Serbs, Croats, Circassians, Bosniaks, Greeks, Aromanians, Ashkali and Balkan Egyptians, Romani, Gorani, and Macedonians from all the regions of the Balkans.

Greater Albania (1940–1944) 

In the newly attached territories to Albania of Kosovo and western Yugoslav Macedonia by the Axis powers, non-Albanians (Serbs and Macedonians) had to attend Albanian schools that taught a curriculum containing nationalism alongside fascism and were made to adopt Albanian forms for their names and surnames.

Muhaxhirs

In Albania 
The Albanian civil service’s policy tends to Albanianize personal names to persons who belong to ethnic or cultural minorities without even asking them.

Greeks 

An Albanisation campaign was initiated as soon as the city of Korçë was handed over to the authorities of the newly established Albanian Principality in March 1914: most Greek schools were closed down, Greek speech was prohibited in churches, while shop signs and other Greek inscriptions in the city were torn down. This campaign was one of the crucial factors that accelerated the local uprising against the Albanian authorities.

During the rule of King Zogu and the communist regime, the government encouraged Albanisation of the Greeks of Southern Albania (the territory was also called "Northern Epirus", especially among the Greeks). 
"Minority status was limited to those who lived in 99 villages in the southern border areas, thereby excluding important concentrations of Greek settlement in Vlora (perhaps 8,000 people in 1994) and in adjoining areas along the coast, ancestral Greek towns such as Himara, and ethnic Greeks living elsewhere throughout the country. Mixed villages outside this designated zone, even those with a clear majority of ethnic Greeks, were not considered minority areas and therefore were denied any Greek language cultural or educational provisions. In addition, many Greeks were forcibly removed from the minority zones to other parts of the country as a product of communist population policy, an important and constant element of which was to preempt ethnic sources of political dissent. Greek place-names were changed to Albanian names, while use of the Greek language, prohibited everywhere outside the minority zones, was prohibited for many official purposes within them as well."

In 1967 the Albanian Party of Labour began the campaign of eradicating organised religion. Their forces damaged or destroyed many churches and mosques during this period; they banned many Greek-language books because of their religious themes or orientation. Yet, it is often impossible to distinguish between the government's ideological and ethno-cultural motivations for repression. Albania’s anti-religion campaign was merely one element in Hoxha's broader “Ideological and Cultural Revolution” begun in 1966. He had outlined its main features at the PLA’s Fourth Congress in 1961. "Under communism, pupils were taught only Albanian history and culture, even in Greek-language classes at the primary level."

Also, the ethnic Greek minority complained about the government's unwillingness to recognize ethnic Greek towns outside communist-era "minority zones," to utilize Greek in official documents and on public signs in ethnic Greek areas, or to include more ethnic Greeks in public administration.

The 2012 USA annual report mention that the emergence of strident nationalist groups like the Red and Black Alliance (RBA) increased ethnic tensions with the Greek minority groups.

Aromanians 

The Aromanians were first recognized at the London Conference of 1912–1913 as a minority group until the communist era (1967). From 1967 until 1992, they were known as simple Albanians, and from 1992 until 2017, they were known as a cultural and linguistic minority. Since 2017, the Aromanians are an officially recognized ethnic minority in Albania.

The recognition of the Aromanians as an Albanian minority has provoked negative reactions from Greece, claiming that Albania, along with Romania, are "colluded in an anti-Greek action". Supposedly, Albania would do this with the intention of weakening the Greek minority in Northern Epirus, while Romania would do this with the intention of "Romanianizing" the "Latin-speaking Greeks" of Albania with the supposed goal of gaining more population.

Serbs and Montenegrins 

In 1921, Albanian government declared that the Greeks were to be registered as a minority, the Orthodox Serbs however were to register themselves as Albanians (thus becoming nationals of Albania) in a two-year period. In the Albanian census the Greeks numbered 15,000 while Serbs and Bulgarians numbered 200 families. During the time of 1921-1928 the Serb community in Albania was strengthened through efforts of the Kingdom of Yugoslavia, which opened several Serbian private schools in 1923-1924 of which the school of Vrake had 72 pupils in 1930, three schools in Shkodra. An ethnic Serb football team existed in Shkodra that competed in the Albanian league. Two youth organizations (Guslar and Obilich) existed in Shkodra. The formation of Orthodox Autocephalous Church of Albania weakened the Serbs and Greeks in the country. The active 14 churches and Monastery were slowly closed by the Albanian government. The Serb school in Vrake was destroyed in 1934.

As part of assimilation politics during the rule of communist regime in Albania, Serb-Montenegrins were not allowed to have Serbian names, especially family names ending with the characteristic suffix "ich". Many Serbs took simple words as surnames: Druri (drvo, tree), Arra (orah, walnut), Guri (kamen, stone), Hekuri (gvožđe, iron), Qershia (trešnja, cherry), Dritarja (prozor, window).

Enver Hoxha decided to destroy the Serbian cemeteries and 2 of the Serb temples. In 1966, the state abolished religion, and in 1968 the state forced parents to name their children with contemporary and revolutionary (Illyrian) names. The surnames were forcibly changed by the Albanian government, from Slavic into Albanian ones, as part of Albanianization.

After the 1981 student protest in Kosovo, Albanian Serbs complained on harassment and pressure to leave the country.

Proposed Albanianisation 
Former Albanian President Bamir Topi and prime minister Sali Berisha made suggestions in 2009 to create a government commission to replace Slavic based toponyms in the county with Albanian language form toponyms.

Reversed Albanianisation 

The Albanian parliament in April 2013 decided to reverse an order from 1973 that changed the Slavic toponyms of several villages in the Pustec Municipality (formerly Liqenas) with Albanian forms that resulted in local Pustec authorities voting to restore pre-1973 toponyms.

In Kosovo 

The concept is most commonly applied to Kosovo.
 During censuses in the former Yugoslavia, many Bosniaks, Romani and Turks were registered as Albanian, as they identified with Muslim Albanian culture as opposed to the Christian Serbian culture. Albanisation has also occurred with Torbesh people, a Muslim Slavic minority in North Macedonia, and the Goran people in southern Kosovo, who often have Albanised surnames.

Arnautaši theory
The term Arnautaši (from Arnauti, a historical Turkish term for Albanians) was coined by 19th century Serbian historians and by that term they meant "Albanized Serbs" (Serbs who had converted to Islam and went through a process of Albanisation). Also, British historian Harold Temperley also considered "Arnauts" as "Albanised Serbs". The term used by Serbian nationalist historiography attributed most to some Albanians from Kosovo but also to Northern Albanians (Ghegs) and was used by some Serbian nationalists to explain the large numbers of Albanians in Kosovo in that migrations of Albanians from Northern Albania was the migration of Serbs to another place and not of a different people. While the theory that acquired its maximal form by nationalist Serb writers Spiridon Gopčević and Miloš Milojević became popular among some Serb historians, Western based historians dismiss it on grounds that had the population been Serbian in Northern Albania, when and how did the process of Albanianisation occur in the first place.

Orahovac
At the end of the 19th century, writer Branislav Nušić claimed that the Serb poturice (converts to Islam) of Orahovac began speaking Albanian and marrying Albanian women. Similar claims were put forward by Jovan Hadži Vasiljević (l. 1866-1948), who claimed that when he visited Orahovac in World War I, he could not distinguish Orthodox from Islamicized and Albanized Serbs. According to him they spoke Serbian, wore the same costumes, but claimed Serbian, Albanian or Turk ethnicity. The Albanian starosedeoci (old families) were Slavophone; they did not speak Albanian but a Slavic dialect (naš govor, "our language") at home. An Austrian Joseph Muller who visited the area (19th century) wrote that the dialect originated from the time of the Serbian uprising (1804) against the Ottomans when Albanians from Shkodër who had resettled around Valjevo and Kraljevo in central Serbia, left after those events for Orahovac. The corpus of Bulgarian terminology in the dialect was unaccounted for by Muller.

In the 1921 census, the majority of Muslim Albanians of Orahovac were registered under the category "Serbs and Croats", based on linguistic criteria.

Mark Krasniqi, the Kosovo Albanian ethnographer, recalled in 1957: "During my own research, some of them told me that their tongue is similar to Macedonian rather than Serbian (it is clear that they want to dissociate themselves from everything Serbian). It is likely they are the last remnants of what is now known in Serbian sources as 'Arnautaši', Islamicised and half-way Albanianised Slavs."

Janjevo
In 1922, Henry Baerlein noted that the Austrians had for thirty years tried to Albanianize the Janjevo population (see also Janjevci).

Ashkali and Romani
The Ashkali and Balkan Egyptians, who share culture, traditions and the Albanian language, are of Romani origin. The "Ashkali" have been classed as a "new ethnic identity in the Balkans", formed in the 1990s.

It was earlier applied to stationary Roma who settled in Albanian areas during Ottoman Empire times. The Ashkalija speak Albanian as their first language. Ashkalija often worked as blacksmiths, or manual laborers on Ottoman estates. Ashkalija are found mainly in eastern and central Kosovo. The Ashkali people claim that they have originated in Persia, now Iran, in 4th century BC (Ashkal, Gilan, Iran); however, there are no indicators for this hypothesis and it not scientifically proven. There are other theories of the Ashkali coming from Turkey in a village called Aşkale (Erzurum district of Turkey), or possibly have come from ages ago in the city of Ashkalon (Israel). Still, some believe they are travelers from Northern India (Romani) who have used the Albanian language as their mother-tongue.

A 14th-century reference to a placename (Агѹповы клѣти, Agupovy klěti) in the Rila Charter of Ivan Alexander of Bulgaria is thought to be related to the Balkan Egyptians according to some authors, such as Konstantin Josef Jireček.

In 1990, an "Egyptian association" was formed in Ohrid, Macedonia. During the Kosovo War, Albanized Roma were displaced as refugees in Albania and the Republic of Macedonia. Many Ashkali fought in the Kosovo Liberation Army. Albanized Roma formed the ethnic group Ashkali after the end of the war in 1999, to show their pro-Albanian stance and distinguish themselves from the Roma.

Placenames
To define Kosovo as an Albanian area, a toponyms commission (1999) led by Kosovan Albanian academics was established to determine new or alternative names for some settlements, streets, squares and organisations with Slavic origins that underwent a process of Albanisation during this period. Those measures have been promoted by sectors of the Kosovan Albanian academic, political, literary and media elite that caused administrative and societal confusion with multiple toponyms being used resulting in sporadic acceptance by wider Kosovan Albanian society.

Alleged Albanianisation

In 1987 Yugoslav communist officials changed the starting grade from the fourth to the first for Kosovo Serb and Albanian students being taught each others languages with aims of bringing both ethnicities closer. Kosovo Serb opposed the measure to the learn Albanian language claiming that it was another way of asserting Albanian dominance and viewed it as more Albanisation of the region. Yugoslav authorities rejected the claim stating that if Albanians also refused to learn Serbian on grounds that it was Serbianisation it would be unacceptable.

In North Macedonia

Alleged Albanianisation

In 1982 Macedonian communist officials accused Albanian nationalists (including some Muslim Albanian clergy) that they placed pressure on Macedonian Romani, Turks and Macedonian speaking Muslims (Torbeš) to declare themselves as Albanians during the census. The Islamic Community of Yugoslavia dominated by Slavic Muslims opposed during the 1980s Albanian candidates ascending to the leadership position of Reis ul-ulema due to claims that Albanian Muslim clergy were attempting to Albanianize the Muslim Slavs of Macedonia. Macedonian communist authorities concerned with growing Albanian nationalism contended that Turks and Macedonian speaking Muslims (Torbeš) were being Albanianised through Albanian political and cultural pressures and initiated a campaign against Albanian nationalism called differentiation involving birth control, control over Muslim institutions and Albanian education, dismissal of public servants and so on.

Riza Memedovski, chairman of a Muslim organisation for Macedonian Muslims in North Macedonia, accused the majority Albanian political party, the Party for Democratic Prosperity in 1990 of trying to assimilate people, especially Macedonian Muslims and Turks and create an "... Albanisation of western Macedonia."

From a Macedonian perspective, the Old Bazaar of Skopje following the 1960s and over a span of twenty to thirty years underwent a demographic change of Albanisation that was reflected in the usage of the Latin alphabet and Albanian writing in shops of the area. In the 2000s, the construction of a Skanderbeg statue at the entrance of the Old Bazaar has signified for some people in Macedonia that the area is undergoing a slow Albanisation.

See also
Macedonian Muslims
Ashkali and Balkan Egyptians
 Albanisation of names

References

Sources

Further reading
 
 
 
 

Cultural assimilation
Social history of Albania